Influenced by Neenasam (Neelakanteshwara Natya Sangha) of Heggodu in Sagar taluk of Shimoga district, Panditaaradhya Swamiji founded the institute Sri Shivakumara Rangaprayoga Shale in 1997. Late C.G. Krishnaswamy, amateur theatre exponent, helped swami in setting up the institute. This theatre institute is the brainchild of Panditaaradhya Shivacharya Swamiji, head of the Veerashaiva religious institution at Saanehalli. The seer is a playwright.

Shivakumara Kalasanga

Admissions
Shivkumar Ranga Prayoga Shale is a reputed, residential school, which gets around 50 applicants every year among whom only the best 18-20 are selected. These students are trained in various aspects of theatre like Abhinaya, Aharya, and Western theatre at the end of which they need to give their exam to get a diploma. The school also absorbs the best of these students to create a new play that tours all over the country for a year. It provides them free board and lodging and education for one year.

Shivasanchara repertory
The institute's repertory organises shows in different parts of the State every year. “Shivasanchara” has produced 36 plays and presented 1,750 shows in various parts of the State and elsewhere.

See also
Neenasam, Heggodu
Rangayana, Mysore
Rangashankara, Bangalore

References

Schools in Chitradurga district